Janthinobacterium agaricidamnosum is a bacterium of the family Oxalobacteraceae and the genus Janthinobacterium that causes a soft rot disease of Agaricus bisporus. Because of this ability, it could help treating diseases caused by fungi in humans. Analyses have shown that jagaricin, a substance which is produced by J. agaricidamnosum, could have a major part for its antimycotic activity.

Etymology
J. agaricidamnosum comes from the Latin word agaricum, which means fungus and the Latin verb damnous, which means destruction (damnosusum = destructive). Agaricidamnosum = damaging mushroom.

References

External links
Type strain of Janthinobacterium agaricidamnosum at BacDive - the Bacterial Diversity Metadatabase

Burkholderiales
Bacteria described in 1999